Garissa is the capital of Garissa County, Kenya. It is situated in the former North Eastern Province.

Geography
The Tana River, which rises in Mount Kenya east of Nyeri, flows through the Garissa. The Bour-Algi Giraffe Sanctuary, situated 5 km south of Garissa, is home to endangered wildlife including the Rothschild giraffe, gerenuk and other herbivores including Kirk's dik-dik, lesser kudu, warthog and waterbuck.

Demographics
The town recorded a population of 319,696 in the 2009 census, which rose to 663,399 in 2019. Most of Garissa's inhabitants are ethnic Somali.

Economy

Garissa is a market centre and the commercial hub of the Garissa County. The town has a university, Garissa University College and a number of colleges including Medical College. In December 2019, the Garissa Solar Power Station was inaugurated, providing grid power to Garissa town.

Banks with a presence in Garissa include the Gulf African Bank situated in the Al-Wayf Quran House, the Postbank in the Garissa Shopping Centre, and the First Community Bank (FCB) in the Bajwed Building. Other banks with branches in the city include Absa Bank, Equity Bank, Kenya Commercial Bank, National Bank of Kenya, Chase Bank and Cooperative Bank of Kenya.

Livestock production is a significant part of the town's economy. Between 2005 and 2007, Garissa cattle producers earned over 1.8 billion shillings in sales in domestic and overseas markets. Construction on a new abattoir also began in October 2007. In terms of livestock imports, most of Garissa's cattle comes from cross-border trade between Somali livestock merchants.

2015 terrorist attack 

On 2 April 2015, gunmen stormed the Garissa University College, killing 147 people and injuring at least 79. The militant group and Al-Qaeda offshoot, Al-Shabaab claimed responsibility for the attack. The gunmen took over 700 students hostage, freeing Muslims and killing those who identified as Christians. The siege ended the same day, when all four of the attackers were killed. Five men were later arrested in connection with the attack, and a bounty was placed for the arrest of a suspected organizer, Mohamed Mahmoud, also known as Dulyadeyn. Dulyadeyn was later killed by U.S.-trained Somali commandos from the Somali National Army on the night of May 31, 2016 in Bulo Gadud, a town loyal to Al-Shabaab, about 30 kilometers north of the port of Kismayo in Somalia.

The Garissa University attack was the second deadliest terrorist attack in Kenyan history since independence (after the 1998 United States embassy bombings in Nairobi, in which 213 people were killed).

Governance
As the capital of Garissa County, Garissa is the seat of the County Government of Garissa as well as the County Assembly. The Governor of the county is Nathif Jama
. The city is represented by Aden Bare Duale, a Somali Member of Parliament for the Garissa Township Constituency in the National Assembly of Kenya. He was elected to the position in the Kenya National Assembly through the United Republican Party, an affiliate party of the Jubilee Alliance. He currently serves as the Majority Leader in the Parliament. During the colonial era, Garissa, as well as other parts of NFD, were collectively conferred to as the British East Africa province of Trans-juba, and would subsequently be referred to as Jubaland, which split into two in the mid 1920s.

Climate
Garissa's landscape is mostly arid, desert terrain. The city lies along the Tana River, and has a hot climate due to the low elevation and distance from cooler coastal areas. The daytime temperature typically rises above  every day, but cools down every night.

See also
Garissa Airport
Roman Catholic Diocese of Garissa
Garissa University College

Notes

 
Populated places in Garissa County
County capitals in Kenya
Tana River (Kenya)